N747PA, was the registration of a Boeing 747-121. Also known as "Clipper Juan T. Trippe", it was the second 747 ever built. It was purchased by Pan Am on October 3, 1970. Following an accident in 1971, the aircraft continued service with Pan Am until its collapse in 1991. It served as a freighter until 1997 when it was used as a source of spare parts. In 2000, it was purchased by a South Korean couple and converted into a restaurant. After laying abandoned for years following the restaurant's failure in 2005, the aircraft was finally scrapped in 2010.

Aircraft history
N747PA was completed on February 28, 1969. Originally registered as N732PA, it was changed to N747PA early on. The aircraft was used as a testbed aircraft by Boeing before being used by Pan Am on an extensive promotional tour across the United States and the rest of the world to showcase the 747 to the public. on January 14, 1970, then First Lady Pat Nixon, christened the aircraft, "Jet Clipper America" at a ceremony at Dulles International Airport. The aircraft joined Pan Am's fleet later that year. With its easy to recognize registration, N747PA became one of the most easily recognized and iconic planes in the Pan Am fleet, even being referred to by some as the airline's de facto flagship aircraft.

Pan Am Flight 845

On July 30, 1971, while operating as Pan Am Flight 845, N747PA struck an approach lighting system, while taking off. The crew had planned and calculated their takeoff for runway 28L, but discovered only after pushback that the runway had been closed hours earlier for maintenance, and that the first  of runway 01R, the preferential runway at that time, had also been closed. After consulting with Pan Am flight dispatchers and the control tower, the crew decided to take off from runway 01R, shorter compared to 28L, with less favorable wind conditions.

Despite the shorter length, it was later determined that the aircraft could have taken off safely, had the proper procedures been followed.

As the crew prepared for takeoff on the shorter runway, they selected 20 degrees of flaps instead of their originally planned 10 degree setting, but did not recalculate their takeoff reference speeds (V1, Vr and V2), which had been calculated for the lower flap setting, and were thus too high for their actual takeoff configuration.

Consequently, these critical speeds were called late and the aircraft's takeoff roll was abnormally prolonged. In fact the first officer called Vr at  instead of the planned  because the end of the runway was "coming up at a very rapid speed."

One of the light beams penetrated the cabin and injured 2 passengers, with one having his foot nearly amputated off. The right main under body landing gear was forced into the fuselage, while the left gear was ripped loose and left dangling. 3 of the 4 hydraulic systems were taken out, as well as several wing and control surfaces, antiskid control and 3 evacuations slides. The aircraft landed back in San Francisco after dumping fuel. Due to the missing landing gear and shift in center of gravity from dumping fuel, N747PA settled on its tail with the nose up. In total, there were 29 injuries, with 8 requiring hospitalization.

The National Transportation Safety Board concluded that pilot error was the cause of the accident, citing the crew's incorrect input of takeoff reference speeds and the unusual nature of the events that led up to the collision.

Later History
After the accident, the aircraft was repaired and returned to service with Pan Am shortly after. In 1973 it was re-registered to N747QC and leased to Air Zaïre, who renamed it to Mont Floyo. It returned to Pan Am in 1975. and renamed to "Clipper Sea Lark" and then "Clipper Juan T. Trippe" in 1980, in honor of the founder of Pan Am, Juan T. Trippe, following his death that year. In 1981, the aircraft received a side cargo door and reinforced floor as part of the United States Department of Defense's airlift requirements under the Civil Reserve Air Fleet.

When Pan Am ceased operation on December 4, 1991, General Electric Credit Corporation took ownership of N747PA. It was the last 747 Pan Am had left when it departed John F. Kennedy International Airport on May 12, 1992. It was leased to Argentinean airline Aeroposta and briefly later to Kabo Air in 1993. The aircraft would be grounded in 1997 and used as a source of spare parts, due to her airframe approaching the need for a major D-Check and no longer conforming to new noise criteria. Eventually, it was broken up in December 1999 at San Bernardino International Airport.

"Jumbo747"

In early 2000, the remains of the aircraft were purchased by a South Korean couple and converted into a restaurant called "Jumbo747". Located in Hopyeong, Namyangju, South Korea, the plane was painted to look like a Boeing VC-25A (Air Force One). The restaurant failed in 2005 and the plane would lie abandoned for several years. After the restaurant shut down, there were petitions and campaigns from numerous aviation enthusiasts for museums or local governments to preserve the historical airplane. Eventually though in December 2010, the remains of N747PA were finally scrapped.

In 2017, Airways Magazine made an article claiming that N747PA had only partially been scrapped and that three major pieces of fuselage were saved and moved not far away to the suburb of Wolmuncheon-ro. The former aircraft was then reported to be used as a church in a Korean Air Livery. (Location:1052-7 Wolmun-ri, Wabu-eup, Namyangju-si, Gyeonggi-do, South Korea). However, this claim was proven false as the 747 claimed to be N747PA had been there long before the aircraft had been scrapped. As of 2020, the unknown church 747 had been removed as well and replaced by a new building.

See also
Pan Am Flight 845

External links
 Entry in a list of Pan Am accidents 1932–1988
 Accident Report
  – video and analysis of the accident
 Photo of accident aircraft N747PA on airliners.net
 Photos of damaged N747PA and memoirs of hangar employee
 Video on the history of N747PA

References

Boeing 747